Thornton is a village in Fife, Scotland.  It is between Kirkcaldy and Glenrothes, and stands between the River Ore and Lochty Burn, which are at opposite ends of the main street. The Church of Scotland parish church was built in 1835 and is located on the Main Street.

Transport 
The village has a small railway station, which is called Glenrothes with Thornton.  Although situated at the south end of Thornton, it also serves the Glenrothes area. This rail halt was opened in May 1992, restoring a rail service to Thornton lost when its main line railway station closed in October 1969 as a consequence of the 1963 report by Dr Richard Beeching on the Reshaping of British Railways (the Beeching Report).

The village is well served by local buses, operated by Stagecoach Group in Fife and running between Kirkcaldy and Glenrothes.  However, express services between those towns bypass Thornton.

Railways
Thornton Junction railway station was opened in the 1840s on the Edinburgh and Northern Railway. During the first part of the twentieth century, Thornton railway station was situated on the Aberdeen to London main line to the east of the village, at the end of Station Road. To the west, alongside the Dunfermline line, the largest railway marshalling yard in Scotland was built during the 1950s. Though much reduced, this yard is still in use for rail freight services.

Coal mining
In 1957, the Rothes Pit was opened to mine the coal in the rural hinterland surrounding the village. This coal mine was tied very closely to the development of the postwar new town of Glenrothes to the north. The planned long-term benefits were to be huge, and were to be the driver for economic regeneration in Central Fife. In 1961, four years after opening, the huge investment was written off and the mine run down because of unstemmable flooding, and closed in May 1962. Ironically, miners who had worked in older deep pits in the area had forewarned against the development of the Rothes Pit for this very reason. The state-of-the art engineering and design was closed, leaving the huge enclosed concrete wheel-towers standing at Thornton for many years as a forlorn symbol of the collapse until 1993, when the towers were demolished.

Sport

In season 2007–08, Thornton Hibs reached the semi-finals of the Scottish Junior Cup, only to be beaten 3-0 by Cumnock after extra time; the Hibs had been reduced to ten men, losing their goalkeeper, in the 89th minute when the score was 0-0.

The village also has its own 18-hole golf course: https://www.thorntongolfclub.co.uk/ and bowling club: http://www.thorntonbowlingclub.co.uk/

Culture
The village holds a Highland Games annually every July.

Thornton is also the birthplace of Sir George Sharp, a Labour politician who led the battle against local government reforms in the 1970s.

Other  
Thornton has a small (5 MegaWatt) solar farm.

References

External links

Villages in Fife
Mining communities in Fife